Sanyuanli Station is a Train station of Line 2 of the Guangzhou Metro. It started operations on 29 December 2002. It is located at Sanyuanli in Baiyun District. It is adjacent to Sanyuanli Anti-British Resistance Monument, Sanyuanli Coach Terminal, Guangzhou Airport Expressway and Jingzhu Expressway.

References

Railway stations in China opened in 2002
Guangzhou Metro stations in Baiyun District